The 1991–92 Polish Cup was the thirty-eighth season of the annual Polish football knockout tournament. It began on 24 July 1991 with the first matches of the preliminary round and ended on 24 June 1992 with the Final. The winners qualified for the first round of the 1992–93 European Cup Winners' Cup. 

GKS Katowice were the defending champions, having won their 2nd title in the previous season. Miedź Legnica won the final match 4–3 on penalties following a 1–1 draw after extra time, thus winning the first Polish Cup trophy in the club's history.

Round of 32

|}

Round of 16

|}

Quarterfinals

|}

Semifinals

|}

Final

References

Polish Cup
Cup
Polish Cup seasons